The Price of Paradise is a BBC Books original novel written by Colin Brake and based on the long running science fiction television series Doctor Who. It was published on 21 September 2006 alongside The Nightmare of Black Island and The Art of Destruction. It features the Tenth Doctor and Rose.

Plot
Laylora, the Paradise Planet, is a world of breathtaking beauty, where peace-loving Aboriginals supposedly live in harmony with their environment. Years ago, a human called Rez arrived on the planet as a baby in an escape pod, and was adopted by the native people. The Doctor and Rose arrive to answer a distress signal from a group of scientists, who were shot down by an EMP, only to find that the once-perfect eco-system is showing signs of failing. Natural disasters are becoming more frequent, and creatures from ancient legends are appearing and attacking people. The Doctor realises that the planet is a perfect equation: when left alone it is a paradise, but when alien objects visit the planet, the equation becomes unbalanced, and the planet causes disasters to try to repair itself.

Continuity
 When an alarm sounds in the TARDIS console room, Rose asks if it is a 'mauve alert'. This universal danger alert was mentioned in "The Empty Child".
 The crystal trisilicate is used as spaceship fuel in the book, and is found in abundance on Laylora.  Trisilicate was first seen in The Curse of Peladon.
 When Rose searches through the pockets of the Doctor's coat, she likens them to the TARDIS as they go on forever.  She discovers a number of iconic items, including a banana ("The Doctor Dances" and "The Girl in the Fireplace"), a yo-yo, and the Fifth Doctor's cricket ball (most memorably seen in Four to Doomsday).  The long-held fan theory that the Doctor's pockets are bigger on the inside was confirmed in "The Runaway Bride".
 A spaceship is reported drifting out of control 'at the edge of Draconian Space.'
 The Doctor quotes Shakespeare, and later claims credit for the final edit of Hamlet, which he also claimed in City of Death.
 For the first time in the novels, a reference is made to one of the other novels in the New Series range. Rose mentions that she is reminded of her visit to Ancient Rome, which took place in The Stone Rose.
 The Doctor mentions the Axons and the Zygons.
 This story probably takes place after The Impossible Planet and The Satan Pit as Rose mentions the Ood.

Audio book
An abridged audio book version of The Price of Paradise read by Shaun Dingwall (Pete Tyler) was released in November 2006 by BBC Audiobooks. Also included was a "behind-the-scenes" discussion between the author and reader.

See also

Whoniverse

External links

The Cloister Library - The Price of Paradise

2006 British novels
2006 science fiction novels
Tenth Doctor novels
Novels set on fictional planets